Rasiklal Umedchand Parikh (18 May 1910 – 1 February 1980) was a noted independence activist, Indian National Congress leader from Gujarat. He served as Chief Minister of Saurashtra State from 1954 to 1956. He served as member of 1st Lok Sabha from Zalawad constituency in 1952 In 2nd Lok Sabha, he was elected from Surendranagar constituency. In 1962, he was MLA from Dasda. He was also a member of 5th Lok Sabha from Surendranagar. He was born at Limbdi and educated at Bombay University and London School of Economics and Political Science. He served as Secretary of Kathiawar Political Conference, 1943-47. He was a Member of the Constituent Assembly of India. He was also a Member of the Saurashtra Legislative Assembly; Minister for Home, Information and P.W.D., Saurashtra, 1948–50; Minister for Home, Ports, Industry 1950-54; Member, Bombay Legislative Assembly; Minister for Revenue, Bombay, 1957–60; Minister for Home and Revenue, Gujarat, 1960–62; Minister for Home and Industry, Gujarat, 1962-63

References

1910 births
1980 deaths
Indian National Congress politicians from Gujarat
People from Surendranagar district
Indian independence activists from Gujarat
Chief ministers of Indian states
India MPs 1952–1957
India MPs 1957–1962
India MPs 1971–1977
Gujarat MLAs 1962–1967
Bombay State MLAs 1957–1960
Members of the Constituent Assembly of India
State cabinet ministers of Gujarat
Prisoners and detainees of British India
University of Mumbai alumni
Alumni of the London School of Economics